Menadione is a natural organic compound with the formula C6H4(CO)2C2H(CH3). It is an analog of 1,4-naphthoquinone with a methyl group in the 2-position. It is sometimes called vitamin K3. Use is allowed as a nutritional supplement in animal feed because of its vitamin K activity.

Biochemistry 
Menadione is converted to vitamin K2 (specifically, MK-4) by the prenyltransferase action of vertebrate UBIAD1. This reaction requires the hydroquinone (reduced) form of K3, menadiol, produced by an unidentified enzyme.

Menadione is also a circulating form of vitamin K, produced in small amounts (1–5%) after intestinal absorption of K1 and K2. This circulation explains the uneven tissue distribution of MK-4, especially since menadione can penetrate the blood–brain barrier. The cleavage enzyme is yet to be identified.

Terminology
The compound is variously known as vitamin K3 and provitamin K3. Proponents of the latter name generally argue that the compound is not a real vitamin due to its artificial status (prior to its identification as a circulating intermediate) and its lack of a 3-methyl side chain preventing it from exert all the functions of the K vitamins.

Uses

It is an intermediate in the chemical synthesis of vitamin K by first reduction to the diol menadiol, which is susceptible to coupling to the phytol.

Menadione can be used to generate reactive oxygen species to perform flow cytometry analysis on. It can also be used in microbiological evaluation to, for example, detect fastidious microorganisms.

Animal feed 
In the United States, menadione is used in various types of animal feed and is described as having a history of safe use for this purpose, being used in poultry feed prior to 1958.

Low-dose menadione is used as an inexpensive micronutrient for livestock in many countries. Forms of menadione are also included in some pet foods in developed countries as a source of vitamin K. These doses have yielded no reported cases of toxicity from menadione in livestock or pets. Although handling may be hazardous, the European Food Safety Authority found in 2013 that it is an effective source of vitamin K in animal nutrition that does not pose a risk to the environment.

Human use 
Despite the fact that it can serve as a precursor to various types of vitamin K, menadione is generally not used as a nutritional supplement in economically developed countries. Menadione for human use at pharmaceutical strength is available in some countries with large lower income populations, such as India. The typical daily dose is 10 mg oral or 2 mg parenteral. It is used in the treatment of hypoprothrombinemia outside of the United States.

Toxicology 
Menadione is not believed to be carcinogenic. K3 can cause generation of reactive oxygen species (ROS) by  redox cycling and arylation of thiols using its reactive 3-position. ROS generation explains various toxic effects of excessive menadione, including DNA damage and cell death, or on a whole-animal level, cardiac and renal toxicity in rats.

References

External links 
 

1,4-Naphthoquinones
Vitamin K